The Mazingira Green Party of Kenya is a Kenyan green party. It was formerly known as Liberal Party of Kenya (LPK). At the 1997 Kenyan General Elections LPK fielded a presidential candidate, Wangari Maathai, who later became a Nobel Peace Prize laureate. Maathai was only a minor candidate. She did not win a parliamentary seat. In 2002, the next general elections were held and the Maathai-led party was part of the victorious NARC coalition. Maathai herself won the Tetu Constituency parliamentary seat.

At the Kenyan general election, 2007, Mazingira was part of the newly created Party of National Unity led by President Mwai Kibaki. However, Mazingira also fielded own candidates. Mazingira won one parliamentary seat at the elections, after Silas Muriuki beat PNU candidate David Mwiraria to clinch the North Imenti Constituency parliamentary seat. Maathai was first outvoted at the PNU primary elections and therefore vied on Mazingira ticket, but at the parliamentary elections lost again to the PNU candidate.
The word Mazingira is Swahili for environment.

See also 

Conservation movement
Environmental movement
List of environmental organizations
Sustainability
Sustainable development

References

External links
MGPK

Green parties in Africa
Political parties in Kenya
Global Greens member parties